Acantholycosa is a genus of wolf spiders. Members of this genus can be distinguished from closely related genera by the presence of more than three pairs of ventral tibial spines on each front leg.  All are found in Asia and Europe with the exception of Acantholycosa solituda, found in North America.

References
Acantholycosa at Encyclopedia of Life

Lycosidae
Araneomorphae genera
Spiders of Asia
Spiders of North America
Taxa named by Friedrich Dahl